The 1883 eruption of Krakatoa in the Sunda Strait occurred from 20 May until 21 October 1883, peaking in the late morning hours of 27 August when over 70% of the island of Krakatoa and its surrounding archipelago were destroyed as it collapsed into a caldera.

The eruption was one of the deadliest and most destructive volcanic events in recorded history. The acoustic pressure wave circled the globe more than three times. At least 36,417 deaths are attributed to the eruption and the tsunamis it created.

Significant additional effects were felt worldwide in the days and weeks after the volcano's eruption. Additional seismic activity was reported until February 1884, but any reports after October 1883 were dismissed by Rogier Verbeek's subsequent investigation into the eruption.

Early phase
In the years before the 1883 eruption, seismic activity around the Krakatoa volcano was intense, with earthquakes felt as far away as Australia. Beginning on 20 May 1883, steam venting began to occur regularly from Perboewatan, the northernmost of the island's three cones.

Eruptions at Krakatoa started again around 16 June, with loud explosions and a thick black cloud covering the islands for five days. On 24 June, a prevailing east wind cleared the cloud, and two ash columns could be seen issuing from Krakatoa. The seat of the eruption is believed to have been a new vent or vents that formed between Perboewatan and Danan. The violence of the ongoing eruptions caused tides in the vicinity to be unusually high, and ships at anchor had to be moored with chains. Earthquakes were felt at Anyer, Banten, and ships began to report large pumice masses to the west in the Indian Ocean.

In early August, a Dutch topographical engineer, Captain H. J. G. Ferzenaar, investigated the Krakatoa islands. He noted three major ash columns (the newer from Danan), which obscured the western part of the island, and steam plumes from at least eleven other vents, mostly between Danan and Rakata. He advised against any further landings.

Climactic phase
By 25 August, the Krakatoa eruptions intensified. At about 1:00 pm on 26 August, the volcano entered its paroxysmal phase. At this point, the eruption was almost continuous, and explosions could be heard every ten minutes.

On 27 August, four enormous explosions occurred, which marked the climax of the eruption. At 5:30 am, the first explosion was at Perboewatan, triggering a tsunami heading to Telok Betong, now known as Bandar Lampung. At 6:44am, Krakatoa exploded again at Danan, with the resulting tsunami propagating eastward and westward. The third explosion has been reported as the loudest sound in history. The loudness of the blast heard  from the volcano has been calculated to have been 180 dB. A large area of the Sunda Strait and places on the Sumatran coast were affected by pyroclastic flows from the volcano. At 10:41am, a landslide tore off half of Rakata volcano, along with the remainder of the island to the north of Rakata, causing the final explosion.

Pressure wave

The pressure wave was recorded on barographs worldwide. Several barographs recorded the wave seven times over five days: four times with the wave travelling away from the volcano to its antipodal point and three times travelling back to the volcano. Hence, the wave rounded the globe three and a half times.

The eruptions diminished rapidly after that point, and Krakatoa was silent by the morning of 28 August. Small eruptions, mostly of mud, continued into October 1883. By then, less than 30% of the original island remained.

Effects

The combination of pyroclastic flows, volcanic ash, and tsunamis associated with the Krakatoa eruptions had disastrous regional consequences. Some land in Banten, approximately 80 km south, was never repopulated; it reverted to jungle and is now the Ujung Kulon National Park. The official death toll recorded by the Dutch authorities was 36,417.

"The Burning Ashes of Ketimbang"
Verbeek and others believe that the final major Krakatoa eruption was a lateral blast, or pyroclastic surge. Around noon on 27 August 1883, a rain of hot ash fell around Ketimbang (now Katibung in Lampung Province) in Sumatra. Approximately 1,000 people were killed in Sumatra; there were no survivors from the 3,000 people on the island of Sebesi. There are numerous reports of groups of human skeletons floating across the Indian Ocean on rafts of volcanic pumice and washing up on the east coast of Africa up to a year after the eruption.

Tsunamis and distant effects
Ships as far away as South Africa rocked as tsunamis hit them, and the victims' bodies were found floating in the ocean for months after the event. The tsunamis which accompanied the eruption were believed to have been caused by gigantic pyroclastic flows entering the sea; each of the four great explosions was accompanied by large pyroclastic flows resulting from the gravitational collapse of the eruption columns. This caused several cubic kilometres of material to enter the sea, displacing an equal volume of seawater. The town of Merak was destroyed by a tsunami that was 46 metres high. There are also indications of submarine pyroclastic flows reaching  from the volcano.

Smaller waves were recorded on tidal gauges as far away as the English Channel. These occurred too soon to be remnants of the initial tsunamis and may have been caused by concussive air waves from the eruption. These air waves circled the globe several times and were still detectable on barographs five days later.

Geographic effects

In the aftermath of the eruption, it was found that Krakatoa had almost entirely disappeared, except for the southern third. Much of the Rakata cone had been sheared away, leaving behind a  cliff. Of the northern two-thirds of the island, only a rocky islet named Bootsmansrots ('Bosun's Rock'), a fragment of Danan, was left; Poolsche Hoed had disappeared.

The huge amount of material the volcano deposited drastically altered the ocean floor. The land masses of Verlaten and Lang islands were increased, as was the western part of the remnant of Rakata. Much of this gained material quickly eroded, but volcanic ash remains a significant part of the geological composition of these islands.

Two nearby sandbanks (called Steers and Calmeyer after the two naval officers who investigated them) were built up into islands by ashfall, but the sea later washed them away. Seawater on hot volcanic deposits on Steers and Calmeyer had caused steam to rise, which some mistook for a continued eruption.

Global climate
The eruption caused a volcanic winter. The record rainfall that hit Southern California during the water year from July 1883 to June 1884 – Los Angeles received  and San Diego  – has been attributed to the Krakatoa eruption. There was no El Niño during that period as is usual when heavy rain occurs in Southern California, but many scientists doubt that there was a causal relationship.

The eruption injected a tremendous amount of sulfur dioxide (SO2) gas high into the stratosphere, which was subsequently transported by high-level winds all over the planet. This led to a global increase in sulfuric acid (H2SO4) concentration in high-level cirrus clouds. The resulting increase in cloud reflectivity (or albedo) reflected more incoming light from the sun than usual and cooled the entire planet until the sulfur fell to the ground as acid precipitation.

Global optical effects

The 1883 Krakatoa eruption darkened the sky worldwide for years afterwards and produced spectacular sunsets worldwide for many months. British artist William Ascroft made thousands of colour sketches of the red sunsets halfway around the world from Krakatoa in the years after the eruption. The ash caused "such vivid red sunsets that fire engines were called out in New York, Poughkeepsie, and New Haven to quench the apparent conflagration". This eruption also produced a Bishop's Ring around the sun by day, and a volcanic purple light at twilight. In 2004, an astronomer proposed the idea that the red sky shown in Edvard Munch's 1893 painting The Scream is an accurate depiction of the sky over Norway after the eruption.

Weather watchers of the time tracked and mapped the effects on the sky. They labelled the phenomenon the "equatorial smoke stream". This was the first identification of what is known today as the jet stream. For several years following the eruption, it was reported that the moon appeared to be blue and sometimes green. This was because some ash clouds were filled with particles about 1 μm wide – the right size to strongly scatter red light while allowing other colours to pass. White moonbeams shining through the clouds emerged blue and sometimes green. People also saw lavender suns and, for the first time, recorded noctilucent clouds.

Death toll 
The official reported death toll was 36,417, although an estimate puts it at 120,000.

Possible causes

The fate of northern Krakatoa has been the subject of some dispute among geologists. It was initially proposed that the island had been blown apart by the force of the eruption. Most of the material deposited by the volcano is magmatic in origin, and the caldera formed by the eruption is not extensively filled with deposits from the 1883 eruption. This indicates that the island subsided into an empty magma chamber at the end of the eruption sequence rather than having been destroyed during the eruptions.

Based on the findings of contemporary investigators, the established hypotheses assume that part of the island subsided before the first explosions on the morning of 27 August. This forced the volcano's vents to be below sea level, causing:
major flooding which created a series of phreatic explosions (interaction of ground water and magma).
seawater to cool the magma enough for it to crust over and produce a "pressure cooker" effect that was relieved only when explosive pressures were reached.

Geological evidence does not support the assumption that only subsidence before the explosion was the cause. For instance, the pumice and ignimbrite deposits are not of a kind consistent with a magma-seawater interaction. These findings have led to other hypotheses: 
an underwater land slump or partial subsidence suddenly exposed the highly pressurized magma chamber, opening a pathway for seawater to enter the magma chamber and setting the stage for a magma-seawater interaction.
the final explosions may have been caused by magma mixing: a sudden infusion of hot basaltic magma into the cooler and lighter magma in the chamber below the volcano. This would have resulted in a rapid and unsustainable increase in pressure, leading to a cataclysmic explosion. Evidence for this theory is the existence of pumice consisting of light and dark material, the dark material being of much hotter origin. Such material reportedly is less than five percent of the content of the Krakatoa ignimbrite, and some investigators have rejected this as a prime cause of the 27 August explosions.

A numerical model for a Krakatoa hydrovolcanic explosion and the resulting tsunami was described by Mader & Gittings, in 2006. A high wall of water is formed that is initially higher than 100 metres driven by the shocked water, basalt, and air.

Verbeek investigation
Although the violent phase of the 1883 eruption was over by the late afternoon of 27 August, after light returned by 29 August, reports continued for months that Krakatoa was still in eruption. Verbeek's committee's earliest duties were to determine if this was true and verify reports of other volcanoes erupting on Java and Sumatra. In general, these were found to be false. Verbeek discounted any claims of Krakatoa still erupting after mid-October due to steaming of hot material, landslides due to heavy monsoon rains that season, and "hallucinations due to electrical activity" seen from a distance.

No signs of further activity were seen until 1913 when an eruption was reported. An investigation could find no evidence the volcano was awakening. It was determined that what had been mistaken for renewed activity had been a major landslide (possibly the one which formed the second arc to Rakata's cliff).

Examinations after 1930 of bathymetric charts made in 1919 show evidence of a bulge indicative of magma near the surface at the site that became Anak Krakatau.

In popular culture

 The explosion has been theorized to be a source of inspiration for Edvard Munch's 1893 painting The Scream. The reddish sky in the background is the artist's memory of the effects of the powerful volcanic eruption of Krakatoa, which deeply tinted sunset skies red in parts of the Western hemisphere for months during 1883 and 1884, about a decade before Munch painted The Scream.
 The Newbery Medal-winning 1947 young adult novel The Twenty-One Balloons, by William Pène du Bois, features the 1883 eruption of Krakatoa as a major plot point.
 The 1966 television episode of The Time Tunnel titled "Crack of Doom" has Tony and Doug transported to Krakatoa on 26 August 1883, the day before the cataclysmic eruption.  
 The 1969 disaster film Krakatoa, East of Java is very loosely based on the 1883 eruption. The title is a notorious geographic error, as Krakatoa is west of Java; the producers wanted "East" instead to suggest the "Far East."

See also

 Fair Wind to Java
 Krakatit
 Krakatoa documentary and historical materials
 List of natural disasters by death toll
 List of volcanoes in Indonesia
 The Devil at 4 O'Clock
 Vog

References
Informational notes

Citations

Bibliography

 Dickins, Rosie; The Children's Book of Art (An introduction to famous paintings), Usborne Publishing Ltd., Usborne House, 83–85 Saffron Hill, London  (2005)
 Furneaux, Rupert; Krakatoa (1965) London, Secker and Warburg.
 
 Simkin, Tom, and Richard S. Fiske (editors); Krakatau, 1883 – the volcanic eruption and its effects (1983) Washington, D.C. : Smithsonian Institution Press. 
 
 
 Verbeek, Rogier Diederik Marius; Krakatau. Batavia, 1885, Internet Archive link
 Winchester, Simon, Krakatoa: The Day the World Exploded: August 27, 1883, New York: HarperCollins (2003),

External links 
 
 Krakatau, Indonesia (1883)  information from San Diego State University

 
19th-century volcanic events
1883 in Asia
1883 in Indonesia
1883 in Oceania
1883 natural disasters
1883 tsunamis
August 1883 events
Events that forced the climate
Eruption
Megatsunamis
Tsunamis in Indonesia
VEI-6 eruptions
Volcanic eruptions in Indonesia
Plinian eruptions
Volcanic tsunamis
Volcanic winters